Hubert Ausböck (born January 8, 1908, date of death unknown) was a German boxer who competed in the 1928 Summer Olympics. He was born in Munich. He participated in 23 fights as a professional, winning 17 of those along with 3 draws and 3 fights also resulting in a loss.

In 1928 he was eliminated in the quarter-finals of the flyweight class after losing his fight to the upcoming gold medalist Antal Kocsis.

References

External links
 
 Hubert Ausböck's profile at Sports Reference.com

1908 births
Year of death missing
Sportspeople from Munich
Flyweight boxers
Olympic boxers of Germany
Boxers at the 1928 Summer Olympics
German male boxers